The boom hitch  is a type of knot. It is a rather robust and secure method of attaching a line, or rope to a fixed object like a pipe, post, or sail boom. 

It can be finished with a slip, that is, a bight tucked under rather than the whole line pulled through in the last step. This will make it easier to untie.

Be sure to work the slack out of all the loops around the foundation.  One way is to vigorously wiggle and tug on both ends at the same time.  Also, it is good to not let the hitch spread out along the foundation, keep the passes around the foundation bunched together snugly.  Once tight, this hitch is quite resistant to sliding along the foundation even if the surface is smooth such as on a steel pipe.

Instructions

See also
List of knots

References

Knots of modern origin